"Something in the Way You Move" is a song by English singer Ellie Goulding from her third studio album, Delirium (2015). The song was serviced to contemporary hit radio in the United States on 19 January 2016 as the album's second single in North America, and third overall. It reached number 51 on the UK Singles Chart and number 43 on the US Billboard Hot 100.

Composition
"Something in the Way You Move" is an electropop song, with a tempo of 108 beats per minute and it uses the chords A, B, C#m, and E. Lyrically, the song describes an ill-fated attraction to someone.
The Guardian Alexis Petridis noted similarities between the song and "Love Me like You Do", another song from Delirium, saying it has "a virtually identical chorus". Eve Barlow of Spin wrote the chorus is reminiscent of the 1980s.

Critical reception
"Something in the Way You Move" received mixed to positive reviews from music critics. MTV News dubbed the song "pure pop bliss". Ian Sandwell of Digital Spy praised it as "pure, unfiltered pop magic" and "pop gold". Idolators Bianca Gracie deemed it "vibrant" and warned not to be surprised if "its bright vibe ends up taking over the radio." However, Music Times gave the track a negative review, calling it "generic pop" and stating there was nothing "interesting" about it. Hazel Cills of Pitchfork wrote that although the song is "a mighty fine song in a vacuum", Selena Gomez had already done something similar with "Me & the Rhythm".

Music videos
A lyric video for "Something in the Way You Move" was released on 9 October 2015, and features fans of Goulding dancing in black and white behind the song's lyrics in lilac and blue. The official music video for the song was directed by Ed Coleman and premiered on 23 February 2016, consisting of live footage of Goulding's performance in Antwerp, Belgium, as part of the Delirium World Tour.

On 21 June 2017, a second video was released to Goulding's Vevo page. Filmed exclusively for Goulding's Deichmann 2017 Spring Summer collection and directed by Emil Nava, the video shows Goulding dancing and performing the song wearing footwear from the collection range.

Live performances
Goulding performed "Something in the Way You Move" on Channel 4's TFI Friday on 27 November 2015. On 31 December, she performed the song on Alan Carr's New Year Specstacular.

Credits and personnel
Credits adapted from the liner notes of Delirium.

Recording
 Recorded at Echo Studio (Los Angeles)
 Mixed at MixStar Studios (Virginia Beach, Virginia)
 Mastered at Sterling Sound (New York City)

Personnel
 Ellie Goulding – vocals
 Greg Kurstin – production, engineering, bass, drums, guitar, piano, keyboards
 Alex Pasco – engineering
 Julian Burg – engineering
 Serban Ghenea – mixing
 John Hanes – engineering for mix
 Tom Coyne – mastering
 Randy Merrill – mastering assistance

Charts

Weekly charts

Year-end charts

Certifications

Release history

Notes

References

External links
 
 

2015 songs
2016 singles
Cherrytree Records singles
Ellie Goulding songs
Interscope Records singles
Song recordings produced by Greg Kurstin
Songs written by Ellie Goulding
Songs written by Greg Kurstin